Information is a 1983 album by Welsh rock musician Dave Edmunds. The album was his second release for Arista Records (in the UK) and Columbia Records (in the US).

Information marked the first time in Edmunds' solo career that he collaborated with an outside producer. Electric Light Orchestra frontman Jeff Lynne produced two songs on the album: the title track, and the Lynne-penned "Slipping Away". The latter would become Edmunds' first American top-40 hit in 13 years (and his last top-40 hit to date), reaching #39 on the Billboard Hot 100. The album itself reached #51 on the Billboard 200 and #92 in the UK.

Other cover versions on the album include NRBQ's "I Want You Bad" and The J. Geils Band's "Wait".

Track listing
 "Slipping Away" (Jeff Lynne)
 "Don't You Double" (Moon Martin)
 "I Want You Bad" (Terry Adams, Phil Crandon)
 "Wait" (Seth Justman, Peter Wolf)
 "The Watch on My Wrist" (Paul Kennerley)
 "The Shape I'm In" (Lee Cathy, Otis Blackwell)
 "Information" (Dave Edmunds, Mark Radice)
 "Feel So Right" (Paul Kennerley)
 "What Have I Got to Do to Win?" (John David, Edmunds)
 "Don't Call Me Tonight" (Dave Edmunds)
 "Have a Heart" (John David)

Personnel
Dave Edmunds - guitar, vocals
Geraint Watkins - accordion
John David - bass
Jeff Lynne -  bass, synthesizer
Dave Charles - drums
Paul Jones - harmonica
Richard Tandy - synthesizer

Charts

References

1983 albums
Dave Edmunds albums
Albums produced by Jeff Lynne
Arista Records albums
Columbia Records albums